Christene is a feminine given name. Notable people with this name include the following:
 Christene Browne (born 1965), Canadian film writer, producer and director
 Christene Mayer (born 1847, American criminal
 Christene Merick (1916 - 2008), American philanthropist
 Christene Palmer (born 1930s), Australian singer and actress

See also
 Christen (disambiguation)
 Christene Volkspartij
 Christine (disambiguation)

Feminine given names